Frank Dean Lucas (born January 6, 1960) is an American politician serving as the U.S. representative for  since 2003, having previously represented the 6th district from 1994 to 2003. A member of the Republican Party, Lucas has chaired the House Committee on Science, Space and Technology since 2023. His district, numbered as the 6th from 1994 to 2003, is Oklahoma's largest congressional district and one of the largest in the nation that does not cover an entire state. It covers 34,088.49 square miles and stretches from the Panhandle to the fringes of the Tulsa suburbs, covering almost half of the state's land mass. Lucas is the dean of Oklahoma's House delegation.

United States House of Representatives

Tenure
On April 7, 2014, Lucas introduced the Customer Protection and End User Relief Act (H.R. 4413; 113th Congress) into the House. The bill would reauthorize the Commodity Futures Trading Commission through 2018 and amend some provisions of the Dodd–Frank Wall Street Reform and Consumer Protection Act.

In 2022, Lucas was one of 39 Republicans to vote for the Merger Filing Fee Modernization Act of 2022, an antitrust package that would crack down on corporations for anti-competitive behavior.

Committee assignments
 Committee on Agriculture
 Committee on Financial Services
 Subcommittee on Capital Markets and Government Sponsored Enterprises
 Subcommittee on Domestic Monetary Policy and Technology
 Committee on Science, Space and Technology
 Subcommittee on Space and Aeronautics
 Subcommittee on Energy and Environment

Caucus memberships
 Congressional Western Caucus

Political campaigns

Oklahoma House of Representatives
Lucas first ran for the Oklahoma House of Representatives in 1984 as a Republican against the incumbent Democrat, narrowly losing. A second attempt in 1986 also fell short, but he won in 1988. He lost in 1990 after the legislature made his district somewhat friendlier to Democrats, but he returned in 1992.

U. S. House of Representatives
In 1994, 6th district Congressman Glenn English stepped down to become a lobbyist for rural electric cooperatives. Lucas won the Republican nomination for the special election on May 10. He faced Dan Webber, press secretary to U.S. Senator David L. Boren. The 6th was already by far the largest in the state, stretching from the Panhandle to the town of Spencer, in the far northeastern Oklahoma City metropolitan area. But the state legislature had redrawn it so that it included many poor Oklahoma City neighborhoods that had never voted Republican. Lucas scored a major upset, winning by eight percentage points and carrying 18 of the district's 24 counties. Some pundits have seen his victory as an early sign of the Republican Revolution that November, when Republicans took control of the House for the first time in 40 years. Lucas won a full term in November with 70% of the vote. He has been reelected seven times, never with less than 59% of the vote, and was unopposed in 2002 and 2004.

Lucas's district was renumbered as the 3rd after Oklahoma lost a district in the 2000 Census. His already vast district was made even larger. He lost most of his share of Oklahoma City, which was home to 60% of the district's population. He once represented much of the downtown area, including the site of the Alfred P. Murrah Federal Building. He still represents the part of the city in Canadian County. To make up for this large population loss, the 3rd was pushed farther east, picking up several of Tulsa's western suburbs (including a small portion of Tulsa itself) and some rural areas. As a result, his district now includes 48.5% of the state's landmass, and is nearly as large as the state's other four districts combined.

Chair of the Science, Space and Technology committee
After Republicans won the House majority in the 2022 elections, Lucas became chair of the Science, Space and Technology Committee, which has jurisdiction over non-defense federal scientific research and development, including NASA, NSF, NIST, and the OSTP. 

Lucas laid out an ambitious agenda for the committee: independence for the National Oceanic and Atmospheric Administration, a federal program to develop unmanned drones, advances in fusion energy, and research money for institutions other than those on the coasts.

2014 Republican primary
In the 2014 Republican primary, Lucas won 83% of the vote. 12% went to Robert Hubbard and 5% to Timothy Ray Murray.

Electoral history

 English resigned mid-term, and Lucas won the special election to succeed him against Democratic opponent Dan Webber.

Personal life
Lucas is a fifth-generation Oklahoman; his family has farmed in western Oklahoma for over 100 years. He lives in Cheyenne with his wife, Lynda. They have three children and three grandchildren.

References

External links
 Congressman Frank Lucas official U.S. House website
 Frank Lucas for Congress
 
 
 

|-

|-

|-

|-

|-

1960 births
21st-century American politicians
Living people
Republican Party members of the Oklahoma House of Representatives
Oklahoma State University alumni
People from Roger Mills County, Oklahoma
Republican Party members of the United States House of Representatives from Oklahoma